Light Years is an album by the Chick Corea Elektric Band. It features Chick Corea with guitarist Frank Gambale, saxophonist Eric Marienthal, bassist John Patitucci, and drummer Dave Weckl. The album received the 1988 Grammy Award for the Best R&B Instrumental Performance (orchestra, group or soloist).

Release and reception 

The album was released by GRP Records. The first edition of The Penguin Guide to Jazz gave the album its worst possible rating, describing it and other Elektric Band releases as "deeply horrid". The AllMusic reviewer concluded that it was "one of The Elektric Band's better releases".

Track listing
"Light Years" – 3:51
"Second Sight" – 4:12
"Flamingo" – 4:08
"Prism" – 3:29
"Time Track" – 5:02
"Starlight" – 3:51
"Your Eyes" – 3:56
"The Dragon" – 5:31
"View from the Outside" – 6:33
"Smokescreen" – 4:24
"Hymn of the Heart" – 6:40
"Kaleidoscope" – 8:03

Tracks 10-12 are bonus tracks on CD reissues.

Chart performance

Personnel 
Musicians
 Chick Corea – keyboards
 Eric Marienthal – sax
 Frank Gambale – guitar
 John Patitucci – bass
 Dave Weckl – drums

References 

1987 albums
Jazz fusion albums by American artists
GRP Records albums
Chick Corea albums